Lac de Blanchemer is a lake at La Bresse in Vosges, France.

Electricity production 
In 1959, a hydroelectric power plant was built below the lake by the Municipal Authority of Electricity. It was used to produce electricity for residents of La Bresse.

References

Blanchemer
Blanchemer
Bogs of France